Amphicoecia phasmatica is a species of moth of the  family Tortricidae found in China's Yunnan province.

References

Moths described in 1937
Cnephasiini
Moths of Asia